Oleksandr Mykolayovych Martsun (born 15 August 1972 in Brovary) is a former Ukrainian football player.

References

1972 births
People from Brovary
Living people
Soviet footballers
FC Ros Bila Tserkva players
Ukrainian footballers
FC Inter Boyarka players
FC Temp Shepetivka players
Ukrainian Premier League players
FC Baltika Kaliningrad players
Ukrainian expatriate footballers
Expatriate footballers in Russia
FC Kuban Krasnodar players
Russian Premier League players
FC Fakel Voronezh players
FC Yenisey Krasnoyarsk players
FC Yednist Plysky players
Association football defenders
Sportspeople from Kyiv Oblast